Cash4Life is an American multi-jurisdictional lottery drawing game; as of April 2021, it is offered by ten state lotteries, and is drawn nightly. Ticket sales began on June 13, 2014, in New York and New Jersey; the first drawing took place three days later.

Rules
Each game costs $2 per drawing. Players pick five white ball numbers from 1 through 60 in the main field, plus one number from 1 through 4 from the second field, the green "Cash Ball". Players also have the option to have the terminal randomly select the numbers in both fields. Matching all five numbers in the main field plus the Cash Ball wins, or shares ("split-prize liability"), the equivalent of $1,000-per-day-for-life, or $7,000,000 cash, at the winner's option. Second prize, however, can have multiple winners of $1,000-per-week-for-life and/or $1,000,000 cash. New Jersey Lottery regulations require that players choose either the annuity or cash option when playing. First- and second-prize winners who chose the "annuity" option can change to the cash option after winning; however, the "cash" option is binding and cannot be changed.

New Jersey's Doubler NJ option
On May 15, 2017, New Jersey added an option, called Doubler NJ; it can be added to a Cash4Life ticket for an additional $1 per play. Any non-"for Life" prize is doubled. New Jersey remains the only Cash4Life state with such an option.

Odds and prizes

The overall odds of winning are approximately 1:7.76. The prize pool is 55 percent of sales.

† The top two annuitized prizes, third prize, and the $1,000 Doubler NJ prize each have a liability limit. If there are an excessive number of winners of a "lifetime" prize tier, such prizes will automatically be paid in cash to each winner. Cash option values (which can change periodically), as of April 2021, are $7,000,000 for the top prize, and $1,000,000 for second prize.

‡ The top prize is "split-prize liability"; in essence, a non-progressive jackpot.

Winners of either "lifetime" prize tier can receive cash in lieu of the lifetime annuity. Rules also vary by Cash4Life member: a ticket bought in Florida whose winner prefers the cash option must claim within 60 days of the drawing. New Jersey requires the cash/annuity choice be made when purchasing a ticket; a "cash option" choice is legally binding, but an "annuity option" ticket can be changed to the "cash option" when claiming.

Drawings

The nightly Cash4Life drawings are held live from Studio B (a.k.a. the Cash4Life Studio) at New Jersey Lottery Headquarters at Lawrence Park Complex in Trenton, New Jersey, at 9:00 p.m. Eastern Time on Livestream. Each drawing is supervised by an auditor from Hamilton, New Jersey-based Mercadien P.C., a CPA and Asset Management firm. The drawings were originally hosted by Erica Young, through May 10, 2018. Lauren Berman replaced Young in 2018. The current hostess is Jacqueline Knox, who previously served as a co-hostess since 2014. If she is unavailable, off-camera announcers are used. The practice of using off-camera announcers have been used particularly during the COVID-19 pandemic.

Two drawing machines are used during each Cash4Life drawing. The larger machine (Magnum II) is used for randomly mixing the 60 white balls by using counter-rotating arms. The smaller machine (Messenger Single Digit) mixes the four green Cash Balls by using a clockwise rotating arm. Individually, the five white balls (several seconds apart) followed by the green Cash Ball are drawn; each ball drops through a hole at the bottom of the appropriate mixing drum. The drawing machines are manufactured by Smartplay International of Edgewater Park, New Jersey.

Cash4Life was initially drawn on Monday and Thursday evenings. Beginning July 1, 2019, Cash4Life is drawn nightly.

Participating lotteries

Ten states currently participate in Cash4Life.

† Original member

1998–2000 MUSL game
Cash4Life was also the name of a significantly different game offered from March 30, 1998, to September 7, 2000, by the Multi-State Lottery Association (MUSL). The top prize, $1,000-per-week-for-life (no cash option), was won if the player's primary set of two-digit numbers (00 through 99) matched those drawn. It was offered in Indiana, Iowa, Kansas, Minnesota, Montana, Nebraska, New Hampshire, South Dakota, West Virginia, Wisconsin, and the District of Columbia.

See also
Lucky for Life, a similar game that began in Connecticut(as Lucky4Life) in 2009; available in 25 states and the District of Columbia as of 2019.

References

External links

 

Lottery games in the United States